Dhaka University Ground is a major public ground hosting matches of domestic and inter-collegiate cricket and football in Dhaka, the capital of Bangladesh.

Only first class cricket match held on 21 May 1966 between Decca Vs. Public Works Department.

The ground hosted inter-hall, intra hall sports every year. It is also used for university's convocation ceremony.

References

Cricket grounds in Bangladesh
Football venues in Bangladesh
Sports venues in Dhaka
Cricket in Dhaka